Goldie Gold and Action Jack is a 30-minute Saturday morning animated series produced by Ruby-Spears Enterprises that aired for one season on ABC from September 12 to December 5, 1981.

The show was rerun on Cartoon Network in 1994, and Boomerang in 2000.

Plot
The series follows the random adventures of Goldie Gold, a blond-and-beautiful teenage heiress whose late parents left her a newspaper called The Gold Street Journal and her boyfriend, ace reporter "Action Jack" Travis, who works very closely with Goldie and her Cocker Spaniel, Nugget. Also frequently seen is Jack's boss, GSJ editor Sam Gritt. Thirteen episodes were produced.

Voice cast
Judy Strangis as Goldie Gold
Sonny Melendrez as Jack Travis
Booker Bradshaw as Sam Gritt

Episode list

Home media
 A VHS tape, Goldie Gold and Action Jack, was released by Worldvision Enterprises in 1985 and contained the episodes "Night of the Crystal" and "Red Dust of Doom".
 A second VHS tape, Goldie Gold and Action Jack: Solid Gold Adventures, was released by Worldvision Enterprises in 1986 and contained the episodes "Island of Terror" and "Revenge of the Ancient Astronaut".
 The episode "Night of the Crystal Skull" was released on DVD in 2010 as part of the collection Saturday Morning Cartoons- 1980s, Volume 1.

References

External links

1980s American animated television series
1981 American television series debuts
1982 American television series endings
American Broadcasting Company original programming
American children's animated adventure television series
Animated duos
English-language television shows
Fictional couples
Television series by Ruby-Spears
Television series created by Steve Gerber
Works by Jack Kirby